Ron Hoffmann is a Canadian diplomat.

Early life and education
Hoffmann was born in Winnipeg, Manitoba in 1960. After graduating from Daniel McIntyre Collegiate Institute (High School), he attended the University of Manitoba where he obtained a B.A. (Honours) in 1984. In 1990, Mr. Hoffmann earned an M.A. (International Affairs) from the Norman Paterson School of International Affairs at Carleton University.

Career
Prior to joining Canada's federal civil service, Mr. Hoffmann worked as a special assistant to Ontario's minister of the environment and as a policy adviser in the Office of the Premier of Ontario.

Hoffmann joined Canada's Department of Foreign Affairs and International Trade in 1989.

Between 1989 and 2004, he held numerous sub-Ambassadorial postings at Canadian missions in The Hague, Johannesburg, Beijing and London. While in London, Hoffmann was minister (political affairs and public diplomacy).

From 2001 to 2002, Hoffmann served as a Senior Departmental Assistant to former Ministers of Foreign Affairs John Manley and Bill Graham.

In 2007, Hoffmann was appointed Canadian first dedicated Deputy Ambassador to Afghanistan, and then in 2008 as ambassador. This period marked the height of Canada's military, diplomatic and development engagement in the country, including Canada's most intense casualty rate. During his two-year tenure in Afghanistan, the Canadian mission reached a civilian deployment 25 times the higher than the level when the Canadian Embassy first opened five earlier.

In June 2009, Hoffmann was appointed Canada's Ambassador to the Kingdom of Thailand, with cross accreditation to Myanmar, Laos and Cambodia. He played an instrumental role in developing Canada's re-engagement policy with Myanmar, working closely reformers in the Myanmar government and with democratic activists, including Aung San Suu Kyi following immediately following her release from house arrest.    Hoffmann returned to the Department of Foreign Affairs and Trade in Ottawa in 2012, appointed to a newly created role of Senior Coordinator for Asia Policy and Strategy, where he led in developing a whole-or-government foreign policy for the Asia region. He was subsequently appointed Director General of Strategic Policy. Among his contributions in that capacity was to write several speeches and op eds for Foreign Minister John Baird.

In September 2014, Hoffmann was appointed Alberta's Senior Representative for the Asia Pacific Basin, and  immediately began to conduct a review of Alberta's offices globally.

Personal life
Hoffmann and his wife, Andrea, have two daughters.

External links 
 Canadian Department of Foreign Affairs and International Trade News Release, 15 June 2009
 Department of National Defence publication 'The Maple Leaf', Vol.12 No.10, March 2009
 'National Post' Daily Newspaper 15 July 2009
 Foreign Affairs Canada - Canadian Representatives Abroad

Ambassadors of Canada to Afghanistan
Ambassadors of Canada to Cambodia
Ambassadors of Canada to Laos
Ambassadors of Canada to Myanmar
Ambassadors of Canada to Thailand
Living people
People from Winnipeg
Year of birth missing (living people)